is a passenger railway station in the town of Kashima, Ibaraki Prefecture, Japan operated by the third sector Kashima Rinkai Railway.

Lines
Kashima-Ōno Station is served by the  Ōarai Kashima Line, and is located 46.1 km from the official starting point of the line at Mito Station.

Station layout
The station consists of a single island platform, connected to the circular station building by a footbridge. The station is unattended.

Platforms

History
Kashima-Ōno Station was opened on 14 March 1985 with the opening of the Ōarai Kashima Line.

Passenger statistics
In fiscal 2015, the station was used by an average of 277 passengers daily.

Surrounding area
 
Arai Post Office
former Ōno Village Hall

See also
 List of railway stations in Japan

References

External links

  Kashima Rinkai Testudo Station Information 

Railway stations in Ibaraki Prefecture
Railway stations in Japan opened in 1985
Kashima, Ibaraki